Ozormište is a village in the municipality of Želino, North Macedonia.

Demographics
As of the 2021 census, Ozormište had 818 residents with the following ethnic composition:
Albanians 806
Persons for whom data are taken from administrative sources 10
Macedonians 2

According to the 2002 census, the village had a total of 1219 inhabitants. Ethnic groups in the village include:

Albanians 1208
Others 11

References

External links

Villages in Želino Municipality
Albanian communities in North Macedonia